The 1992 Atlantic Coast Conference baseball tournament was the 1992 postseason baseball championship of the NCAA Division I Atlantic Coast Conference, held at Greenville Municipal Stadium in Greenville, South Carolina, from May 9 through 13.  defeated Clemson in the championship game, earning the conference's automatic bid to the 1992 NCAA Division I baseball tournament.

Format 
All nine teams qualified for the conference tournament, with several byes allowing for a nine-team double-elimination tournament.

Seeding Procedure 
From TheACC.com:
On Saturday (The Semifinals) of the ACC Baseball Tournament, the match-up between the four remaining teams is determined by previous opponents. If teams have played previously in the tournament, every attempt will be made to avoid a repeat match-up between teams, regardless of seed. If it is impossible to avoid a match-up that already occurred, then the determination is based on avoiding the most recent, current tournament match-up, regardless of seed. If no match-ups have occurred, the team left in the winners bracket will play the lowest seeded team from the losers bracket.

Regular season results

Tournament

Winner & Loser Bracket Games

Main Bracket 

To clarify the brackets above, the match-ups (by round) to the reordered semifinals were as follows:
 1st Round: Clemson vs. Virginia, Duke vs. Wake Forest, Florida State - bye, NC State vs. Maryland, Georgia Tech v. North Carolina
 2nd Round (winner's): Clemson - bye, Florida State v. Wake Forest, NC State v. Georgia Tech
 2nd Round (loser's): Virginia vs. Duke, Maryland vs. North Carolina
 3rd Round (winner's): Clemson vs. Florida State, NC State - bye
 3rd Round (loser's): Georgia Tech vs. Duke, Wake Forest vs. North Carolina
 4th Round (winner's): NC State vs. Clemson
 4th Round (loser's): Georgia Tech - bye, North Carolina vs. Florida State

All-tournament team

See also 
 College World Series
 NCAA Division I Baseball Championship
 Atlantic Coast Conference baseball tournament

References 

Tournament
Atlantic Coast Conference baseball tournament
Atlantic Coast Conference baseball tournament
Atlantic Coast Conference baseball tournament
College baseball tournaments in South Carolina
Baseball competitions in Greenville, South Carolina